The 2015 Toppserien is the twenty-nine season of top-tier women's football in Norway since its establishment in 1987. A total of 12 teams contested for the league, eleven returning from the 2014 season and the one teams promoted from the First Division, Sandviken.

The season started on 28 March 2015 and ended on 7 November 2015.

Teams

League table

Relegation play-offs
Medkila won the relegation-playoff 3–0 and 5–0 against Grand Bodø and remained in the league.

Top goalscorers

References

External links
Toppserien - Norges Fotballforbund
Season on soccerway.com

Toppserien seasons
Top level Norwegian women's football league seasons
Norway
Norway
1